Balestier was a constituency represented in the Legislative Council of Singapore from 1951 until 1955. In 1955, the constituency was abolished and split into Cairnhill, Farrer Park, Serangoon and Whampoa constituencies.

Legislative Council member

Elections

Elections in 1950s

References 

Singaporean electoral divisions
Constituencies established in 1951
Constituencies disestablished in 1955
1951 establishments in Singapore
1955 disestablishments in Singapore